Berejiklian ministry may refer to:

First Berejiklian ministry, January 2017 to March 2019
Second Berejiklian ministry, April 2019 to date